Adhir Kalyan is a South African actor noted for his role as Timmy in the CBS sitcom Rules of Engagement and as Awalmir Karimi/'Al' in United States of Al.

Early life
Kalyan was born in Durban, South Africa, to an Indian South African family. His mother, Santosh Vinita "Sandy" Kalyan, was a member of Parliament in the South African National Assembly, where she represented the Democratic Alliance.

Kalyan completed his schooling at Marklands in Durban. Prior to moving abroad, he performed in a number of productions in South Africa, including theatrical adaptations of Charles Dickens' Oliver Twist and A Christmas Carol, an adaptation of Salman Rushdie's The Ground Beneath Her Feet, and the classical Shakespearean play Macbeth.

Career
In 2005, Kalyan moved to London to pursue his acting career where he gained roles in the BBC series Holby City (series 8) as Arjmand Younis, in Spooks (series 5), and on the Irish network RTÉ One in Fair City as Ramal Kirmani. Kalyan also appeared in a number of independent films.

Kalyan starred in the short-lived American CW Television Network sitcom Aliens in America, as a foreign exchange student from Pakistan living with a Wisconsin family. He portrayed recurring characters in the fifth season of the cable show Nip/Tuck, and in the third season of the CBS sitcom Rules of Engagement, becoming a series regular in the latter's fourth season.

In 2009, Kalyan appeared in the film Paul Blart: Mall Cop as Pahud, a teenager who admired his girlfriend Parisa, in Up in the Air as a fired employee, and in the cheerleader comedy Fired Up. In 2010, he appeared in Youth in Revolt, and in 2011, he appeared in a minor role in No Strings Attached.

In late 2015, he began starring in the Fox science fiction crime drama Second Chance.

In December 2019, Kalyan was cast to portray Afghan interpreter Awalmir Karimi ("Al"), the main protagonist in the CBS sitcom United States of Al. The sitcom premiered on April 1, 2021, surrounded with controversy. Released to mostly negative reviews, the show and its makers were criticized for the show's humor, use of antiquated tropes, and in particular, critics called out the casting of a South-African-born Indian actor to play an Afghan lead and his use of an inauthentic accent.

Personal life
In March 2015, he became engaged to actress Emily Wilson of General Hospital. He and Wilson married on October 1, 2016, at Colony 29 in Palm Springs, CA.

Filmography

References

External links
 

1983 births
Living people
Actors from Durban
South African male film actors
South African people of Indian descent
South African male television actors
Male actors of Indian descent
21st-century South African male actors